Vivian Zahl Olsen (born 24 January 1942) is a Norwegian artist, graphic designer and illustrator.

Vivian Zahl Olsen was educated at the Norwegian National Academy of Craft and Art Industry. She has contributed to several television series for the Norwegian Broadcasting Corporation, including  Fru Pigalopp, Flode and Puslespill. She has also illustrated around seventy books, mostly for children.

She was awarded the Jacob Prize (Jacob-prisen) in 1980. She received the Cappelen Prize in 1981. Since 1992, she has been married to Per Haugan.

References

External links
Vivian Zahl Olsen (Bokillustrasjon)
Fru Pigalopp (NRK)

1942 births
Living people
People from Asker
Norwegian illustrators
Norwegian children's book illustrators
NRK people